Spigot Peak is a conspicuous black peak 285 m, marking the south side of the entrance to Orne Harbour on the west coast of Graham Land. Shown on an Argentine government chart of 1950. The name, given by the United Kingdom Antarctic Place-Names Committee (UK-APC) in 1956, is descriptive of the appearance of the feature; a spigot is a wooden peg.

See also
Sophie Rocks

References

Mountains of Graham Land
Danco Coast